= Jihad-e-Asghar =

For the Islamic concept of Jihad-e-Asghar see:

- Jihad-e-Asghar in mainstream Islam
- Jihad-e-Asghar in Ismailism
